Kinoguitan, officially the Municipality of Kinoguitan, is a 5th class municipality in the province of Misamis Oriental, Philippines. According to the 2020 census, it has a population of 14,091 people.

The town name Kinoguitan is spelled by the old folks especially during the early 1950s as Kinogitan.

Geography

Barangays
Kinoguitan is politically subdivided into 15 barangays.
 Beray
 Bolisong
 Buko
 Kalitian
 Calubo
 Campo
 Esperanza
 Kagumahan
 Kitotok
 Panabol
 Poblacion
 Salicapawan
 Salubsob
 Suarez
 Sumalag

Climate

Demographics

Economy

References

External links
 [ Philippine Standard Geographic Code]
Philippine Census Information
Local Governance Performance Management System

Municipalities of Misamis Oriental